ASTM Subcommittee E20.02 on Radiation Thermometry is a subcommittee of the ASTM Committee E20 on Temperature Measurement, a committee of ASTM International. The subcommittee is responsible for standards relating to radiation or infrared (IR) temperature measurement. E20.02's standards are published along with the rest of the E20's standards in the Annual Book of ASTM Standards, Volume 14.03.

History

The E20.02 was started shortly after the E20 Committee was established in 1962.

Membership

Membership in the organization is open to anyone with an interest in its activities. Participating members join this subcommittee to write standards and to forward their own interests.

Subcommittee meetings generally take place in May and November as part of the E20 meetings.

Current standards
E1256-11a Standard Test Methods for Radiation Thermometers (Single Waveband Type)

This standard contains test methods for the following areas:

Calibration accuracy test method
Repeatability test method
Target size test method
Response time test method
Warm-up time test method
Long-term drift test method

E2758-10 Standard Guide for Selection and Use of Wideband, Low Temperature Infrared Thermometers

E2847-11 Standard Practice for Calibration and Accuracy Verification of Wideband Infrared Thermometers

Current work items

WK37564 New Classification for Radiation Thermometers

Future work items

Special issues in using a wideband low temperature instrument 
Specification of IRTs
Calibration of IR thermometers

See also
ASTM
Black body
Emissivity
Infrared thermometer
Kirchhoff's law of thermal radiation
Planck's law
Pyrometer
Radiance
Rayleigh–Jeans law
Sakuma–Hattori equation
Stefan–Boltzmann law
Thermal radiation
Thermography
Thin filament pyrometry
Wien approximation
Wien's displacement law

References

External links
 
Black body emission calculator

ASTM standards